Survivor Srbija VIP: Philippines is the third season of the Serbian version of the Survivor television series, created by Vision Team production company and broadcast by Prva Srpska Televizija (new name of Fox televizija). This is also the first season of VIP format.

VIP season of Survivor Srbija is an international co-production recorded on the Caramoan Peninsula in the Philippines, as in the second season.

In addition to Serbia, the show was broadcast in Bosnia and Herzegovina (Televizija OBN), Macedonia (Sitel televizija) and Montenegro (TV In). Bosnian, Macedonian and Montenegrin version omitted the word 'Srbija' from the show title - it is titled simply VIP Survivor.

Featuring 16 contestants (8 men and 8 women), broadcast started on October 22, 2010 in Serbia and Bosnia and Herzegovina; in Macedonia on October 24, 2010; in Montenegro on October 25, 2010.

The show is hosted by Andrija Milošević.

Andrej Maričić was named the winner in the final episode on January 5, 2011, defeating Toni "Zen" Petkovski and Katarina Vučetić with a vote of 8-4-2 and he won a prize of €50.000.

Contestants

The Total votes is the number of votes a castaway has received during Tribal Councils where the castaway is eligible to be voted out of the game.  It does not include the votes received during the final Tribal Council.

 On day 1, the castaways were told they would divide into two tribes: woman tribe and man tribe, eight members each. But on day 3 in new swap, castaways divided in new two tribes, but that time each tribe had four women and four men.

 On day 11 in new swap, tribe leaders of Bahandi and Kasuko, Marko and Bojana changed their tribes, but they had the opportunity to choose one castaway from their tribe to go with them in new tribe; Marko chose Goca, Bojana chose Nikola. On day 14 in new swap, Bojana and Nikola returned to Kasuko, but because Marko voted out on the last tribal council, only Goca returned to Bahandi.

 Toni was eliminated in challenge, he was not voted out regularly at Tribal Council.

 Because Toni and Marko were back in merge tribe on day 20, they are listed as having placed in two different points in the game.

The game
Cycles in this article refer to the three-day periods in the game (unless indicated), composed of at least the Immunity Challenge and the subsequent Tribal Council.

In the case of multiple tribes or castaways who win reward or immunity, they are listed in order of finish, or alphabetically where it was a team effort; where one castaway won and invited others, the invitees are in brackets.

 First challenge was a "Tribe leader"; there was a two challenges, one for woman and one for man. The winners are tribe leader. Bojana win for woman and Marko win for man. Through cycle 2 to 9 the winner of challenge had the opportunity to choose "Double Vote" or "Black Vote" and at cycle 10 the challenge was "Place in the Final" where the remain castaway compete in 3 final challenges for place in the final.

 There was no immunity challenge due to both tribe voted out one castaway from tribe on tribal council.

 No one was sent to Exile Island because it was not yet known to the castaways.

 New Kingdom was not yet introduced.

 Nikolija was evacuated from New Kingdom on day 8, due to medical reasons.

 There was no reward challenge due to "fake merge", instead that, castaways compete in challenge, where loser must be eliminated. Loser is Toni and he is eliminated. In that challenge Bojana played the Hidden Immunity Idol, so she doesn't compete.

 There was no reward challenge because of the merge.

 The tribe leader rule was no longer applicable after the tribal merge, as there was only one tribe.

 After merge the castaways were told that there were one place in new merge tribe for one voted out player; then voted out castaways compete in challenge, the winner will be back in merge tribe. The winner is Toni and he must to choose one voted out player to join him in new tribe; Toni chose Marko, so merge tribe is complete.

 New Kingdom was discontinued after merge.

 There was no winner in this challenge because castaways objected to eat in challenge "Survivor kitchen".

 This challenges is not active at cycle 17.

 The hidden immunity idol was null after day 29, therefore Exile Island was discontinued.

 After final challenge Goca became 3rd finalist, so Marko, Jelena and Katarina was eliminated, but on final Tribal council they have a last chance to become 4th finalist. Katarina win in challenge on Tribal council and she became a last finalist.

 After final Tribal council the castaways were told that jury will vote live in the final, so there is no vote at final Tribal council. In live show a jury vote for a winner, but finalist with fewest votes became a 12th jury member. That was Goca, with neither vote, and she can vote for a winner.

Voting history
Tribal Council (TC) numbers are almost the same as Cycle numbers as a Tribal Council occurs at the end of each cycle; eliminations that happen outside a Tribal Council do not bear a Tribal Council number, but count towards a cycle. Episode numbers denote the episode(s) when the voting and subsequent revelation of votes and elimination during a Tribal Council took place. They can also denote the episode wherein a contestant officially left the game for any reason.

 This castaway could not vote at Tribal Council, because s/he had the "Black Vote necklace".

 On 9th Tribal Council the castaways voted out two persons, although they vote only one time.

 The public from Serbia and from region (Macedonia and Montenegro) was allowed to award a jury vote to one of the finalists. Public from Serbia gave one vote for Andrej and public from region gave one vote for Toni.

References

External links
Fan site
Official site

Serbia
Survivor Srbija
2010 Serbian television seasons
2011 Serbian television seasons
Television shows filmed in the Philippines